Htike Htike Aung (was born 1 February 1995, in Myanmar) is a footballer from Burma, and a defender for the Myanmar under-20 football team and Yangon United. He can play center back and right full back.

In 2019, Yangon United signed Htike Htike Aung. He played in Myanmar U-20 national team for 2015 FIFA U-20 World Cup in New Zealand.

Honours
Hassanal Bolkiah Trophy: 2014
2015 General Aung San Shield:Champion

References

FIFA.com

1995 births
Living people
People from Yangon Region
Burmese footballers
Myanmar international footballers
Association football defenders
Shan United F.C. players
Footballers at the 2018 Asian Games
Competitors at the 2017 Southeast Asian Games
Asian Games competitors for Myanmar
Southeast Asian Games competitors for Myanmar